Ahyi Seamount is a currently erupting shallow submarine volcano in the Northern Mariana Islands, in the Northwestern Pacific Ocean. It has erupted 3 times since the year 2000; in 2001, 2014 and 2022–23. Since 2009, it has been a part of Marianas Trench Marine National Monument of the United States.

Geography

Ahyi is a submarine volcano which can be in the northern portion of the Mariana Arc. Nearby seamounts include Makhahnas Seamount  to the west and Supply Reef  to the south.

Geologic setting
The Ahyi Seamount can be found on the Mariana Arc, which is an arc of volcanoes of submarine origin which occurs as a result of subduction of the Pacific Plate lithosphere under the Philippine Sea Plate. The chain can be found west of the Mariana Trench where the Pacific Plate subducts through and east of the Mariana Trough, which is a back-arc basin. Since the 1800s, 6 of the 9 volcanic islands in the Mariana Arc have had recorded activity. Other than islands, around 60 seamounts can be found in the arc and more than 20 of them have hydrothermal venting and 6 of them have had a recorded eruption.

Petrology
During the 2014 eruption, several samples of plumes from Ahyi were collected.

Activity
Multiple occurrences of volcanic activity have been detected at the Ahyi-Supply Reef region since the 60s. Most observations of activity have come from hydrophone recordings or seismograph recordings with very large location uncertainty which makes it unable to be assigned to a specific seamount. In other cases, observations came from direct observations at the location like discolored water on the sea surface.

1960-70s activity
In 1969, seismic and hydrophone detections from far away of volcanic explosions from Ahyi were recorded; although the discolored water was seen a bit farther away from Ahyi, right in between Supply Reef and Ahyi. This activity in 1969 was described as similar to hydrophone recordings in the same region in 1967. In 1979, a fishing boat reported upwelling water and pumice with sulfur composition near Ahyi.

2014 eruption

In late April 2014, Ahyi erupted, ending a 13-year dormancy period with an explosive eruption which lasted more than 2 weeks. At the time of the eruption, the remote location of the volcano and the presence of nearby volcanoes made it hard to understand the actual location of the eruption. The explosions were recorded by hydrophones in the region including in Wake Island and by seismographs including in Guam and Chichijima. Following May 8, acoustic waves from the events were observed until May 17. In the same area, the NOAA crew observed orange-yellow bubbles covering parts of the sea surface. Despite these observations, satellite products did not show anything unusual throughout the whole eruption. During mid-May, an expedition on a NOAA ship which was planned to pass around the Ahyi eruption area was able to collect some samples and information about the eruption. Multibeam bathymetries were obtained at the same expedition. Plume particles were observed at three CTD casts of Ahyi.

2022-23 eruption
The eruption has been on-going since November 18, 2022.

See also
 NW Rota-1

References

Sources
 
 
 
 
 

Seamounts of the Pacific Ocean
Mariana Islands
Active volcanoes
Submarine volcanoes